The Avenging Rider is a 1928 American silent Western film directed by Wallace Fox and starring Tom Tyler, Florence Allen and Frankie Darro.

Cast
 Tom Tyler as Tom Larkin 
 Florence Allen as Sally Sheridan 
 Frankie Darro as Frankie Sheridan 
 Al Ferguson as Bob Gordon 
 Bob Fleming as Sheriff 
 Arthur Thalasso as Dance professor

References

External links
 

1928 films
1928 Western (genre) films
1920s English-language films
American black-and-white films
Films directed by Wallace Fox
Film Booking Offices of America films
Silent American Western (genre) films
1920s American films